Leonardo Passos Alves (born November 29, 1989 in Jacobina, Brazil), known as Leo,  is a Brazilian footballer, who plays for Kuching City In Malaysia. Leo plays mainly as a striker.

In August 2013 he signed a contract with FC Metalurh Zaporizhya. In January 2020, he signed a contract with Kuching FA 
He is playing at Kuching city since January 2020.
Leonardo Alves has been played in a lot of teams around the world. He was part of Chicago and Portugal team.

References

External links

1989 births
Living people
Brazilian footballers
Brazilian expatriate footballers
Expatriate footballers in Ukraine
Expatriate footballers in Portugal
Expatriate footballers in Israel
Expatriate footballers in Saudi Arabia
Expatriate footballers in Bahrain
Expatriate footballers in Kuwait
Criciúma Esporte Clube players
Beitar Jerusalem F.C. players
Hapoel Acre F.C. players
Grêmio Barueri Futebol players
FC Metalurh Zaporizhzhia players
Hakoah Maccabi Amidar Ramat Gan F.C. players
PFC Levski Sofia players
Vegalta Sendai players
Israeli Premier League players
Ukrainian Premier League players
Liga Leumit players
Al-Mujazzal Club players
Ettifaq FC players
Al-Tai FC players
Riffa SC players
Al-Arabi SC (Kuwait) players
Al-Adalah FC players
Al Safa FC players
Brazilian expatriate sportspeople in Ukraine
Brazilian expatriate sportspeople in Portugal
Brazilian expatriate sportspeople in Israel
Brazilian expatriate sportspeople in Saudi Arabia
Brazilian expatriate sportspeople in Bahrain
Brazilian expatriate sportspeople in Kuwait
Saudi Professional League players
Saudi First Division League players
Saudi Second Division players
Association football forwards
Kuwait Premier League players